The 2016 Hillah suicide truck bombing was a suicide bombing on March 6, 2016, that killed at least 60 people and another 70 were injured after ramming his explosives-laden truck into a security checkpoint at one of entrances to the Iraqi city of Hillah, south of Baghdad. The Islamic State of Iraq and the Levant (ISIL or ISIS) claims responsibility for the attack.

See also
 2005 Al Hillah bombing
 2007 Al Hillah bombings
 2014 Hillah bombing
 November 2016 Hillah suicide truck bombing
 List of terrorist incidents, January–June 2016

References

2016 murders in Iraq
21st-century mass murder in Iraq
March 2016 crimes in Asia
March 2016 events in Iraq
Mass murder in 2016
Mass murder in Iraq
Massacres in Iraq
Suicide car and truck bombings in Iraq
Terrorist incidents in Iraq in 2016
Hillah